The 1953 Idaho Vandals football team represented the University of Idaho in the 1953 college football season. The Vandals were led by third-year head coach Raymond "Babe" Curfman and were members of the Pacific Coast Conference. Home games were played on campus at Neale Stadium in Moscow, with two games in Boise at old Bronco Stadium at Boise Junior College.

Led on the field by quarterback George Eidam, Idaho compiled a  record and were winless in their three PCC games.

The Vandals suffered another loss in the Battle of the Palouse with neighbor Washington State, falling  at Neale Stadium on October 17.

In the rivalry game with Montana at Missoula two weeks earlier, the Vandals ran their winning streak over the Grizzlies to three and retained the Little Brown Stein.  Idaho scored twenty unanswered points to win 20–12, in their sole victory of the season.

Curfman made headlines in 1953 as his overmatched Vandals struggled in conference play in the PCC, and was under fire from alumni and boosters after a disappointing season. Following his resignation in December, he was hired as the business manager for the Spokane Indians minor league baseball team in January 1954.

Schedule

 One game was played on Friday (opener, night game at San Jose State)

All-conference
No Vandals were on the All-PCC team; fullback Flip Kleffner was named to the second team and center Mel Bertrand was honorable mention.

NFL Draft
One senior from the 1953 Vandals was selected in the 1954 NFL Draft:

One junior was selected in the 1955 NFL Draft:

 Often incorrectly listed as a UI Vandal, tackle Norm Hayes (1954 draft, #217) played at the College of Idaho in Caldwell.
List of Idaho Vandals in the NFL Draft

References

External links
Gem of the Mountains: 1954 University of Idaho yearbook – 1953 football season
Go Mighty Vandals – 1953 football season
Official game program: Idaho at Utah – September 26, 1953
Idaho Argonaut – student newspaper – 1953 editions

Idaho
Idaho Vandals football seasons
Idaho Vandals football